Saint-Sulpice is a municipality in the Lanaudière region of Quebec, Canada, part of the L'Assomption Regional County Municipality. It is located on the north shore of the Saint Lawrence River and includes most of Verchères Islands.

History
From 1680 onwards, French settlers colonized this area, clearing the land for cultivation. At that time it was part of the Saint-Sulpice Seignory that was owned by the Society of Saint-Sulpice. In 1640 the seignory granted a concession to Pierre Chevrier, Baron of Fancamp, and to Jérôme Le Royer.

In 1706, the settlement was assigned its first pastor and in 1715, it had the region's only flour mill in operation. The Parish of Saint-Sulpice was formed in 1722, taking its name from the seignory. In 1845, the parish municipality was formed and in 1854, its post office opened.

Demographics 

Education

The Sir Wilfrid Laurier School Board operates anglophone public schools, including:
 Joliette Elementary School in Saint-Charles-Borromée

Sister city
Saint-Jean-d'Angély (France)

See also
 List of parish municipalities in Quebec

References

External links

Incorporated places in Lanaudière
Parish municipalities in Quebec
Quebec populated places on the Saint Lawrence River
Canada geography articles needing translation from French Wikipedia